Atilije Venturini (12 August 1908 – 15 June 1944) was a Yugoslav swimmer. He competed in two events at the 1924 Summer Olympics.

References

External links
 

1908 births
1944 deaths
Yugoslav male swimmers
Olympic swimmers of Yugoslavia
Swimmers at the 1924 Summer Olympics